Kanapathy Selvanayagam is a  Sri Lankan Tamil politician  and a Member of Parliament belonging to the Eelam Revolutionary Organisation of Students.He was elected from the Jaffna Electoral District in 1989.

References

Eelam Revolutionary Organisation of Students politicians
Members of the 9th Parliament of Sri Lanka
Sri Lankan Tamil politicians